Greg Evangelatos is an American para-alpine skier. He represented the United States at the 1984 Winter Paralympics and at the 1992 Winter Paralympics in alpine skiing. In 1992 he won the gold medal in the Men's Giant Slalom B1 event and the silver medal in the Men's Super-G B1 event.

At the Men's Giant Slalom B1 event he was the only competitor to receive a medal.

References 

Living people
Year of birth missing (living people)
Place of birth missing (living people)
Paralympic alpine skiers of the United States
American male alpine skiers
Alpine skiers at the 1984 Winter Paralympics
Alpine skiers at the 1992 Winter Paralympics
Medalists at the 1992 Winter Paralympics
Paralympic gold medalists for the United States
Paralympic silver medalists for the United States
Paralympic medalists in alpine skiing
20th-century American people